The following list includes notable people who were born or have lived in Elmhurst, Illinois. For a similar list organized alphabetically by last name, see the category page People from Elmhurst, Illinois.

Academics 

 Charles Tilly, sociologist

Arts and culture 

 Keenan Cahill, internet celebrity for lip-syncing
 Ken Hudson Campbell, American actor (Home Alone)
 Catherine E. Coulson, actress (Twin Peaks "Log Lady")
 John Grochowski, author and radio personality
George Peter Alexander Healy, painter
 Tom Higgenson, singer for pop punk band The Plain White T's
 Louisa Boyd Yeomans King, gardener and author; resided 1890–c. 1902
 Rachel Melvin, actress
 Rick Nielsen, musician (Cheap Trick)
 The Orwells, punk rock band
 Phillip Ramey, composer and pianist
 Gary Rydstrom, sound engineer, director
 Carl Sandburg, poet, historian, and novelist
 Michelle Slatalla, journalist and humorist
 Ian Michael Smith, actor (Simon Birch)
 Modern Vices, rock band
 Mars Williams, musician (The Psychedelic Furs)
 Michael Salvatori, composer

Authors and scientists 

 Patrick Piemonte, computer scientist, inventor, and human interface designer; born in Elmhurst

Military 

 William J. Cullerton (1923–2013), World War II flying ace who flew with the 357th Fighter Squadron, conservationist and member of the Cullerton political family
 Theodore L. Kramer (1847–1910), recipient of the Medal of Honor in the American Civil War; buried in Elmhurst

Politics and civics 

 William J. Bauer, Chief Judge of the United States Court of Appeals for the Seventh Circuit from 1986 to 1993. He was first appointed to the bench by Richard Nixon in 1971. He was raised in Elmhurst and attended Elmhurst College.
 Thomas Barbour Bryan, businessman and politician
 Charles Page Bryan, diplomat
 Dan Cronin, Chairman of the DuPage County Board since 2010 and member of the Illinois Senate from 1993 to 2010.
 Lee A. Daniels, 66th Speaker of the Illinois House of Representatives who represented all or parts of Elmhurst from 1975 until 2007.
 Eugene V. Debs, founding member of the Industrial Workers of the World and five time presidential candidate for the Socialist Party of America. He died at Lindlahr Sanitarium, a Nature Cure treatment facility located in Elmhurst.
 Edwin Feulner, founding trustee of the Heritage Foundation, a conservative Washington, D.C. think tank. He is credited with building it into one of the most influential conservative think tanks. He moved to Elmhurst at age 9 and attended Immaculate Conception High School.
 Natalie Jaresko, Ukraine's Minister of Finance (2014–2016). She was born in Elmhurst and raised in nearby Wood Dale.
 Daniel Keefe, president and founder of the International Longshoremen's Association and Commissioner-General of Immigration under William Howard Taft. He died in Elmhurst on January 2, 1929.
 Jack T. Knuepfer, member of the Illinois Senate from 1967 until 1975 and Chairman of the DuPage County Board from 1978 until 1990.
 Arthur C. Lueder, Illinois businessman and politician who served as Illinois Auditor of Public Accounts and as a Republican member of the Illinois House of Representatives.
 Lewis V. Morgan, Illinois state representative, judge, and lawyer
 Chris Nybo, member of the Illinois Senate and past member of the Elmhurst City Council.
 Jim Ryan, Illinois Attorney General from 1995–2003.
 Jerry Stermer, 8th Illinois Comptroller who served briefly after the death of Judy Baar Topinka. He was raised in Elmhurst.
 Tom Van Norman, Democratic member of the South Dakota House of Representatives from 2000–2008.

Sports 

 Greg Bloedorn, long snapper for the Seattle Seahawks
David Cohn (born 1995), American-Israeli basketball player in the Israel Basketball Premier League
 Darrin Fletcher, catcher for the Los Angeles Dodgers, Philadelphia Phillies, Montreal Expos and Toronto Blue Jays
 Jody Gerut, outfielder for the Milwaukee Brewers
 Jeff Hornacek, NBA player
 Skip James, player for the San Francisco Giants
 Danny Jansen, catcher for the Toronto Blue Jays
Garth Lagerwey, general manager for the Seattle Sounders FC
 Fred Lorenzen, former NASCAR driver
 Mike Magee, soccer forward for the New York Red Bulls, Los Angeles Galaxy, and Chicago Fire; 2013 MLS Most Valuable Player
 Keith McCready, pool player
 Joe Newton, former York High School cross country and track coach, won 29 state titles
 Jack O'Callahan, former Chicago Black Hawks hockey player
 Steve Rushin, Sports Illustrated writer
 Donald Sage, cross country runner
 Dan Schatzeder, pitcher, played for nine different teams
 Mark Sibley, NBA player
 Garret Sparks, goaltender for the Toronto Maple Leafs
 Larry Stefanki, tennis player
 Al Weis, infielder with the Chicago White Sox (1962–1967) and NY Mets (1968–1971)
 Mark Wilson, pro golfer
 John Witt, author, sportswriter, actor and ballhawk

Other
 John R. MacDougall, hijacker, suspect of the Captain Midnight broadcast signal intrusion in 1986

References

Elmhurst
Elmhurst